Bettina Hoffmann may refer to:

 Bettina Hoffmann (artist) (born 1964), German artist
 Bettina Hoffmann (musician) (born 1959), German musician
 Bettina Hoffmann (politician) (born 1960), German politician